Bandar Lampung (formerly Dutch: Oosthaven, lit. "Eastern Harbor") is the capital and largest city of the Indonesian province of Lampung. Located on the southern tip of Sumatra, Bandar Lampung was originally called Tanjungkarang–Telukbetung, since it was a unification of two major settlements in Lampung, before being renamed in 1983.

The city proper and South Lampung Regency (which borders the city on its northern and eastern sides) are major transmigrasi recipients; in testimony thereof, it has become the fourth-largest city in the region of Sumatra, after Medan, Palembang and Batam. The city's area is about 197.22 km2, with a census population of 790,057 in 2005, 881,801 in 2010, 977,686 in 2015 and 1,166,066 in 2020.

History 
Bandar Lampung is the capital city of Lampung Province, before it was named Bandar Lampung, this city was named Tanjung Karang-Teluk Betung City. Historically, before becoming Bandar Lampung City, it was a combination of the two twin cities of Tanjung Karang and Teluk Betung City, the two twin cities were previously part of South Lampung Regency. This naming is because at that the city of Bandar Lampung consisted of the city of Tanjung Karang and city of Teluk Betung, in 1982 there was an expansion of the territory with the entry of three new districts

Early history 
A report by the Banten regent William Craft to Governor-General Cornelis Speelman states that, on the basis of a description provided by Pangeran Aria Dipati Ningrat on 17 June 1682, "Lampung-Telokbetong at the edge of the sea is the seat of power of a Dipati Temenggung Nata Negara, with power over three thousand people". This date would later be adopted by the city administration as its official founding date.

Dutch East Indies 

Under the Dutch colonial administration, 1912 Staatsblad 462 codified the city as being part and parcel of the Onderafdeling Telokbetong, composed of present-day Teluk Betung and its environs. The Onderafdeling's capital was Tanjung Karang, whilst Telukbetung itself served as the seat of government for the Karesidenan Lampung.

Tanjungkarang Formerly 
Bandar Lampung, formerly Tanjungkarang-Telukbetung, kota (city), capital of Lampung provinsi (or provinsi; province), Indonesia. It lies at the head of Lampung Bay on the south coast of the island of Sumatra. Bandar Lampung was created in the 1980s from the amalgamation of the former provincial capital, Tanjungkarang, with the port of Telukbetung. The city's cottage industries include metalworking, hand-weaving, and pottery and tile making. With air, road, and rail connections, Bandar Lampung is the chief port and transportation center for the surrounding agricultural area, which produces rubber, tea, coffee, and pepper for export.

Under Japanese occupation 
During the Japanese colonial era, present-day Bandar Lampung was administered as a city (市, shi), led by a Japanese mayor (市長, shicho) who was assisted by an Indonesian deputy mayor (副市長, fuku-shicho).

Post-Independence 
Tanjung Karang and Telukbetung initially fell under the jurisdiction of South Lampung Regency, until a 1948 law consolidated the two and elevated them to independent city status.

Administrative districts

At the time of the 2010 census, the city of Bandar Lampung was divided into thirteen administrative districts (Indonesian: kecamatan), but subsequently seven additional districts have been created by the splitting of existing districts, bringing the total to twenty districts. The new districts are Bumi Waras, Enggal, Kedamaian, Labuhan Ratu, Langkapura, Teluk Betung Timur (East Teluk Betung) and Way Halim.

The twenty districts are tabulated below with their areas and their populations at the 2010 census and the 2020 census. The table also includes the number of administrative urban villages (kelurahan) in each district and its postal codes.

Note: (a) the 2010 population of this new district is included in the figures for the district(s) from which it was separated.

Climate
Bandar Lampung has a tropical rainforest climate (Af) with heavy rainfall year-round. Rain gets noticeably heavier from November to April.

Transportation

Air

Bandar Lampung is served by Radin Inten II Airport (TKG), in the neighbouring county of South Lampung. The airport can be accessed by public transportation, such as bus and mini bus.

Road transport

Bandar Lampung has several road transportation alternatives. The most popular is a minibus called angkot, an abbreviation from Angkutan Kota (literally translated as City Transportation). They serve routes throughout the city, operated privately and cheaply. Usually, an angkot covers some area between Tanjung Karang (heart of Bandar Lampung) and an urban area. Currently, routes covered are Tanjung Karang - Garuntang, Tanjung Karang - Teluk Betung, Tanjung Karang - Rajabasa, Tanjung Karang - Sukarame, Tanjung Karang - Langkapura and many more.

Bandarlampung Transportation Office has announced that in October 2011 will serve two of seven routes planned by bus rapid transit — the Rajabasa-Sukaraja and Sukaraja-Korpri housing complex in Sukarame.

Rail transport

Tanjung Karang Station in Bandar Lampung is the terminus of the railway service from Palembang, although the railway track continues all the way until Panjang harbor and Tarahan coal offloading point. Many express trains connecting this city and Palembang, including Limex Sriwijaya and Rajabasa Express.

Education

In 2009, Bandar Lampung has a literacy rate of 94.3%, slightly increased from 2005 which was 93.5%. However, the high school participation rate kept decreasing from 69.2% (2007) down to 61.4% (2009). On the other hand, high school participation rate in Indonesia rose from 54.6% in 2007, to 55.8% in 2010.

There are some notable high schools and universities in Bandar Lampung such as SMP Negeri 2 Bandar Lampung (public), SMP Negeri 1 Bandar Lampung (public), SMA Negeri 2 Bandar Lampung (public, known as Smanda), SMA Negeri 9 Bandar Lampung (public, known as Smalan), SMA Negeri 1 Bandar Lampung (public, known as Smansa), SMA Al-Kautsar Bandar Lampung (private), SMA Fransiskus Bandar Lampung (private), SMP Xaverius 4 (private Catholic junior high school), SMA Xaverius Pahoman (a Catholic private school teaching students from kindergarten to high school, locally known as Xavepa), Lampung University (public, locally known as Unila), Bandar Lampung University (private, locally known as UBL: Universitas Bandar Lampung),Muhammadiyah University of Lampung (known as UML: Universitas Muhammadiyah Lampung and Malahayati University (private). In March 2011, Unila already had 70,866 alumni.

Sister cities
Bandar Lampung is twinned with:
  Liwa, Indonesia
  Kuantan, Malaysia
  Ipoh, Malaysia
  Split, Croatia

See also
 List of twin towns and sister cities in Indonesia
 Law

References

External links 

Official Lampung Provincial Website (in Indonesian)
Official Government Kota Bandar Lampung Website (in Indonesian)
Trip to Bandar Lampung (in Japanese)

 
Populated places in Lampung
Provincial capitals in Indonesia